The  is Japanese aerial lift line in Nikkō, Tochigi, operated by . The Tōbu Group company mainly operates bus lines in the city. The observatory has a view of Kegon Falls, Lake Chūzenji, and Mount Nantai. The line opened in 1933, and reopened in 1950.

Basic data
Cable length: 
Vertical interval:

See also
List of aerial lifts in Japan

External links

 Nikko-Kotsu official website

 

Aerial tramways in Japan
1933 establishments in Japan
Transport infrastructure completed in 1933